Ellen Street is a parallel road to High Street in Fremantle, Western Australia. It was named after Ellen Stirling (née Mangles), wife of Governor Stirling.

It has a range of heritage listed properties on its southern side including Christian Brothers College and Samson House, and on the northern side has the Fremantle Bowling Club  at the intersection with Parry Street, Fremantle Park, and John Curtin College of the Arts.

Intersections

See also

Notes

 
Streets in Fremantle